Waikuku is a small town in the Canterbury region of New Zealand, which sits 28 km north of central Christchurch. In 1901 there were 86 people resident in Waikuku according to that year's census. Waikuku settlement had a population of 156 people at the time of the 2018 Census. It is popular with both those that commute into work in Christchurch each day and with owners of holiday houses. Waikuku was home to  rope and twine works. This business started off using flax from local swamps. It closed in 1987. The nearby sandy beach and pine forests are popular with surfers, swimmers, campers and horse-riders, and the large estuary of the Ashley River hosts many species of birds. 

Just south of Waikuku, on Preeces Road, are the remains of the Kaiapoi Pa, an important trading centre for Ngāi Tahu in the 18th century.

Road safety 
The section of state highway 1 that runs through the middle of Waikuku  has been described as "one of the most notorious roads in Canterbury” by Waka Kotahi NZ Transport Agency noting that “In the ten years from 2009 to 2018, six people were killed and 33 were seriously injured in crashes" on state highway 1 in North Canterbury. As a result, the speed limit through the Waikuku township is being reduced from between 80 km/h and 100 km/h to 60 km/h from December 2020. This has led to frustration as the North Canterbury community have been requesting the road to be upgraded to the proposed but unfunded extension of the Christchurch Northern motorway (including the Woodend Bypass).

Demographics
It is part of the wider Waikuku statistical area.

Waikuku settlement had a population of 156 at the 2018 New Zealand census, an increase of 36 people (30.0%) since the 2013 census, and an increase of 51 people (48.6%) since the 2006 census. There were 54 households. There were 81 males and 75 females, giving a sex ratio of 1.08 males per female. The median age was 46.3 years (compared with 37.4 years nationally), with 21 people (13.5%) aged under 15 years, 33 (21.2%) aged 15 to 29, 84 (53.8%) aged 30 to 64, and 21 (13.5%) aged 65 or older.

Ethnicities were 96.2% European/Pākehā, 13.5% Māori, and 1.9% Asian (totals add to more than 100% since people could identify with multiple ethnicities).

Although some people objected to giving their religion, 57.7% had no religion, 28.8% were Christian, 1.9% were Buddhist and 3.8% had other religions.

Of those at least 15 years old, 18 (13.3%) people had a bachelor or higher degree, and 24 (17.8%) people had no formal qualifications. The median income was $41,400, compared with $31,800 nationally. The employment status of those at least 15 was that 78 (57.8%) people were employed full-time, 33 (24.4%) were part-time, and 3 (2.2%) were unemployed.

Waikuku statistical area

Waikuku had a population of 1,635 at the 2018 New Zealand census, an increase of 177 people (12.1%) since the 2013 census, and an increase of 222 people (15.7%) since the 2006 census. There were 594 households. There were 828 males and 810 females, giving a sex ratio of 1.02 males per female. The median age was 43.1 years (compared with 37.4 years nationally), with 315 people (19.3%) aged under 15 years, 246 (15.0%) aged 15 to 29, 849 (51.9%) aged 30 to 64, and 225 (13.8%) aged 65 or older.

Ethnicities were 94.5% European/Pākehā, 11.6% Māori, 1.3% Pacific peoples, 2.4% Asian, and 1.3% other ethnicities (totals add to more than 100% since people could identify with multiple ethnicities).

The proportion of people born overseas was 17.4%, compared with 27.1% nationally.

Although some people objected to giving their religion, 60.2% had no religion, 29.7% were Christian, 0.2% were Muslim, 0.2% were Buddhist and 1.8% had other religions.

Of those at least 15 years old, 234 (17.7%) people had a bachelor or higher degree, and 246 (18.6%) people had no formal qualifications. The median income was $36,700, compared with $31,800 nationally. The employment status of those at least 15 was that 723 (54.8%) people were employed full-time, 243 (18.4%) were part-time, and 30 (2.3%) were unemployed.

Education
Waikuku presently has no schools. The town previously had one full primary (Year 1–8) school, Waikuku School, which opened in 1872. The school outgrew its site in the late 2000s and early 2010s, and in April 2014 was relocated to a new site in Pegasus, New Zealand and renamed Pegasus Bay School. The site is now used as an outdoor shopping mall called Old School Collective.

Primary school students today are zoned for Pegasus Bay School; secondary school students are zoned for Kaiapoi High School in Kaiapoi.

References

Bibliography

Populated places in Canterbury, New Zealand
Waimakariri District